Duets is an album by American jazz saxophonists Roscoe Mitchell and Anthony Braxton recorded in 1976 and released on the Sackville label.

Reception
The Allmusic review by Brian Olewnick awarded the album 4 stars stating "this is a fine meeting between two of the most forward-looking thinkers and players in the music".

Track listing
 "Five Twenty One Equals Eight" (Roscoe Mitchell) - 4:52 
 "Line Fine Lyon Seven" (Mitchell) - 1:15 
 "Seven Behind Nine Ninety-Seven Sixteen or Seven" (Mitchell) - 2:37 
 "Cards-Three and Open" (Mitchell) - 10:52 
 "Composition 40Q" (Anthony Braxton) - 6:46 
 "Composition 74B" (Braxton) - 6:35 
 "Composition 74A" (Braxton) - 7:56 
Recorded at Thunder Sound in Toronto, Canada on December 13, 1977

Personnel
Roscoe Mitchell, Anthony Braxton - reeds

References

Sackville Records albums
Anthony Braxton albums
Roscoe Mitchell albums
1978 albums